Fletcher High School is a school in Gweru, Zimbabwe. It was one of the first boarding schools during the colonial era prior to  the Zimbabwe revolution. It was opened in 1957. 

The first principal was D Davies. It was established as a boys' school but is currently co-ed, having admitted the first group of female students in 1982.

Academic education
The school offers secondary education starting form 1 to form 6. Students in form 4 and form 6 write the local national examinations in line with the Zimbabwean secondary school education system.

Currently the school is under the headmaster Steven Njini.

References

Boarding schools in Zimbabwe
Educational institutions established in 1957
1957 establishments in Southern Rhodesia
High schools in Zimbabwe
Buildings and structures in Midlands Province
Education in Midlands Province
Gweru